Lovran is a village and a municipality in Primorje-Gorski Kotar County, Croatia. It is situated in eastern Istria, on the western coast of the Kvarner Bay with a population of 4,101 in the municipality and 3,336 in the town itself (2011 census). Its name derives from Laurel (Laurus nobilis), as shown in the coat of arms.

Lovran is one of the oldest coastal settlements on the eastern shore of Istrian peninsula. According to one legend, the town was created when the Roman patrician and statesman Marcus Vipsanius Agrippa built his summer residence on the site in the first century AD. By the early Middle Ages it was an important urban and shipbuilding center of northern Adriatic. Following the sudden development of port towns in the vicinity (Trieste, Pula, and Rijeka) which became the new and dominant urban centers in the region, Lovran lost its significance.

However, by the mid 19th century, the area gains prominence as it becomes a fashionable resort for the Austro-Hungarian nobility. The long tradition of tourism is still strongly felt in the Lovran region, and it forms the backbone of the economy.

The region is rich with cultural-historical heritage. A parish church with medieval frescoes and Glagolitic inscriptions, and the 14th century tower of St George's Square within the old urban core, as well as rural ambiances and architectural edifices – namely turn-of-the-century villas with surrounding parks, are general points of interest.

Sister cities 
 Castel San Pietro Terme, Italy
 Ravenna, Italy
 Nova Gorica, Slovenia

Monuments and sights

Art installation "Puli Mȁlina" (By the Mill) 
"Puli Mȁlina" (By the Mill), a site-specific art pavilion by artist Davor Sanvincenti was built on the renovated remains of the old mill along the hiking trail in Lovranska Draga. The pavilion is made from natural materials from the immediate surroundings – from chestnut wood, known as “marun”, and from local stone. The concept of the pavilion is based on the idea of creating a space which, through the processes of integration into the already existing environment of Lovranska Draga, becomes a place of meeting and rest, i.e. a natural shelter and a place of learning about the peculiarities of this area. Due to the specific position of the south window, visitors have the opportunity to experience unusual interplay of sunbeams and water on the spring and fall equinox.

References

External links 

 Official pages
 Tourism Association for the City of Lovran
 www.itm.hr - About Lovran

Municipalities of Croatia
Populated places in Primorje-Gorski Kotar County
Populated coastal places in Croatia